Higonoumi Naoya (born 23 September 1969 as Naoto Sakamoto) is a former sumo wrestler from Kumamoto, Japan. After his retirement he opened up Kise stable.

Career
A former amateur champion at Nihon University, he turned professional in 1992, joining Mihogaseki stable and making his debut in the makushita division as a makushita tsukedashi entrant. Initially fighting under the shikona of Sakamotoyama, he lost only two bouts in his first three tournaments, reaching the jūryō division in July 1992 and the top makuuchi division in February 1993. He was ranked in the top division for 53 consecutive tournaments, every one as a maegashira. This remains a record for a wrestler that never reached the san'yaku ranks, although Kyokushūzan later had more consecutive tournaments as a maegashira after his single tournament as a komusubi. He earned two kinboshi for defeating yokozuna - Akebono in May 1995 and Takanohana in March 1999. He fell back to the jūryō division at the end of 2001 and retired a year later in November 2002 at the age of 33.

Retirement from sumo
He remained in sumo as a coach under the elder name of Kise, and opened up his own training stable, also called Kise, in December 2003. He produced the top division wrestlers Kiyoseumi in 2008 and Gagamaru in 2010. In May 2010 Kise was demoted two ranks by the Sumo Association after he was found to have made arrangements for the distribution of tickets to the previous July's Nagoya tournament that ended up in the hands of around 50 high-profile yakuza affiliated to the Yamaguchi-gumi crime syndicate. As a result, Kise stable closed down and Kise and all his wrestlers moved to Kitanoumi stable, where Higonoumi worked as an assistant coach. He has admitted that until around 2007 he had ties with a yakuza member. He was allowed to re–open Kise stable in April 2012, and in September of that year his wrestler Jōkōryū earned promotion to makuuchi in a record nine tournaments from jonokuchi. He has since produced a number of other sekitori including Hidenoumi, Tokushōryū and Ura.

Fighting style
Higonoumi's most common winning kimarite or techniques were basic and straightforward ones: yorikiri, a force out, and oshidashi, push out. He also regularly used hatakikomi (slap down), okuridashi (push out from behind), tsukiotoshi (thrust over) and uwatedashinage (pulling overarm throw).

Career record

See also
Glossary of sumo terms
List of past sumo wrestlers
List of sumo elders

References

External links

1969 births
Living people
Japanese sumo wrestlers
Sumo people from Kumamoto Prefecture
People from Kumamoto
Nihon University alumni